The history of air traffic control in the United Kingdom began in the late 1950s, and early 1960s, when an integrated and coordinated system began, once radar had become sufficiently advanced to allow this.

London Airport
On 15 July 1919, the world's first commercial flight occurred, when Henry Shaw (1892-1977) piloted a de Havilland DH.9 for Aircraft Transport and Travel from Hendon to Le Bourget airfield in Paris. The pilot did not have a passport. 

Jimmy Jeffs was the world's first air traffic controller at London Airport on 22 February 1922. The Mayday callsign originated at London Airport in 1921.

From 1928, radio signals from Croydon,  Pulham in Norfolk and Lymm in Kent triangulated the position of aircraft; a similar system was set up by Germany in 1940, known as the Battle of the Beams.

Development of radar

On the evening of 25 February 1935 at Stowe Nine Churches (Upper Stowe) in Northamptonshire, the so-called Daventry experiment took place with Robert Watson-Watt to prove that radar detection of aircraft was possible.

Ground-controlled interception (GCI) was first developed in the UK during the early part of WWII, at RAF Sopley in Hampshire, close to Bournemouth. Development of the system began in October 1940, and the first ground-controlled interception took place on 1 January 1941 with the Bristol Beaufighter at RAF Middle Wallop, and the call sign Starlight. From late 1941, GCI would be carried out by the AMES Type 7 radar, which provided a 360 degrees view; such radar was developed at the Telecommunications Research Establishment (TRE).

Integration
On Wednesday 18 June 1958, a £5m plan for coordinating air traffic control was announced. Four new radar centres would be built; previous to this, ATC personnel received aircraft positional information over the radio from pilots, not from any radar. The UK Air Traffic Service began in September 1959; it controlled air movements above 25,000 ft.

The USA had created its Federal Aviation Administration (FAA) also in 1958.

Routes
Upper airspace routes, known as airways, were created in the early 1950s.

In the first phase of airways
 Green Airway One opened on 1 August 1950, from the Irish Sea - Strumble Head - Bristol - London.

In the second phase of airways
 Green Airway One, was extended eastwards via North Foreland to a point 21 miles off the east coast, for London to Brussels traffic
 Amber One, Daventry - Dunsfold - Dieppe - Paris, later extended to Manchester
 Amber Two  Paris - Abbeville - Brookmans Park - Daventry
 Red One, Dunsfold - North Foreland - Amsterdam
 Blue One, Bletchley - Watford - Crowborough
 Red Two, Woodley - Epsom - Kent

Coordinating organisation
On Monday 10 December 1962, Julian Amery, the Minister for Aviation, announced the new National Air Traffic Control Services, with a central controller. Military air traffic control was controlled by the Military Air Traffic Organisation.

The London Terminal Control Centre at RAF West Drayton opened in November 1966, but only received radar coverage in 1971; previous to that, Southern Radar had been headquartered at RAF Sopley in Hampshire from 1959. NATCS, the coordinating organisation, became NATS in April 1972, when it became part of the CAA. Computer flight plans were implemented in 1975.

The London Area Control Centre at West Drayton moved to Swanwick, Hampshire at 2.30am in the morning on Sunday 27 Jan 2002, when 29-year-old controller Sarah Harris guided an Airtours International Flight AIH 550 from Gran Canaria Airport at Las Palmas safely into Birmingham Airport. Swanwick had been hoped to open in 1996 and to cost £350m. Swanwick oversaw flights above 20,000 feet, excluding those around Manchester under 21,000 feet and around South East England under 24,500 feet.

At London in 1990, a £22m IBM 4381 computer (IBM 370 architecture) replaced an ageing IBM 9020, which was three IBM 360/65 computers. The Princess Royal opened the new computer on 18 June 1990. London looked after the sectors of Daventry, Pole Hill - Northern England, Bristol - Strumble Head, Irish Sea, Cardiff, Dover - Lydd, Clacton, North Sea and Hurn - Seaford - Worthing.

Swanwick was intended to replace two sites at West Drayton and Manchester (at Manchester Airport), but the West Drayton centre remained open to oversee London and South East England, and was planned to close in 2007; it closed on 23 November 2007 when around 500 staff moved to Swanwick. NATS also have a technical centre in Whiteley. The RAF 78 Sqn moved to Swanwick from January 2008. Swanwick receives radar information from nine radar sites.

Controllers
ATC personnel were represented by the Institution of Professional Civil Servants, which became Institution of Professionals, Managers and Specialists in 1989.

Training
In the early 1960s, both military and civil radar operators were trained at a joint school at RAF Sopley.

Around sixty countries would send ATC trainees to the College of Air Traffic Control (CATC) in Dorset, including Eastern Europe. The Central Air Traffic Control School trained military ATC personnel from 1963; the first women ATC trainees began later in 1963.

Aircraft movements
There were 372,000 aircraft movements in the UK in 1960, 480,000 in 1962, and 610,000 by 1969.

In 2017, NATS handled around 2.5 million flights.

The UK has the third-largest aviation network after the US and China. Up to 80% of North Atlantic air traffic passes through UK airspace. The
Shanwick OCA (Shanwick Oceanic Control) was formed in 1966, and controlled from Prestwick, with two communication towers in southern Ireland and Gloucestershire.

The Concorde route from Heathrow Airport to Bahrain was the world's first supersonic air transport route.

Radar stations
Marconi Radar Systems, who built much of the radar, had sites at Bill Quay in Gateshead (mechanical infrastructure), in the north of Leicester (at the junction of Blackbird Road and Anstey Lane), and two large sites in Chelmsford, although much of these radars were for air defence.

27 Doppler VOR (VHF omnidirectional range) beacons, costing £3.5m, were built in 1982 by Racial Avionics (former Decca Radar) of New Malden.

In June 2016 Raytheon received a contract to supply the Mode S monopulse secondary radar to all of NATS 23 radar sites. A Radar Reference Facility was built by Raytheon in Hampshire, to train staff.

Civilian

 Allans Hill, Aberdeenshire

 Blackpool, has a Raytheon ASR 10SS; it was fitted with 500kW 50cm Marconi Type 264A, when operating the Mediator system

 Claxby, also known as Lincoln, in north-east Lincolnshire, has a 250 mile range, on land owned by BT

 In August 1970, a new £150,000 Plessey DASR-1 radar for Titterstone Clee Hill, in Shropshire, was built; Clee Hill had RAF radar during World War II, but this site had closed in 1956

 Cromer Radar was set up in the late 1980s, with a link to a new air traffic control centre at Stansted; it had Plessey Watchman as its primary radar for the North Sea, often for helicopters travelling to North Sea oil platforms. The RAF and RN also had Cromer as their primary radar; it worked via a travelling-wave tube.

 Debden, Uttlesford, in Essex, has a 160 mile range

 Heathrow opened in November 1985 with a 250 mile range, and a 37-metre-high concrete tower, that was built by Fairclough Civil Engineering of Adlington in Lancashire

 Pease Pottage, in the north-east of West Sussex, opened in December 1986, on land owned by the Met Office, with a 160 mile range

 Perwinnes Hill, near Aberdeen, for Aberdeen Airport at Dyce, and the helicopters for the North Sea; it had a Marconi 264 radar installed on 7 October 1976

 Tiree, at Ben Hynish on the Inner Hebrides, it has a 250 mile range; it replaced a military radar in Northern Ireland, and opened in July 1986; a new television transmitter was required to be built as well; the structural engineer was Sir Frederick Snow

Military
By 1964, the RAF had four main military radar units.
 Hack Green, near Baddington in south Cheshire
 RAF Boulmer, on the Northumberland coast
 RAF Sopley in south-west Hampshire
 RAF Bishops Court, near Killard Point, near Downpatrick, County Down, in Northern Ireland

Former
 Ash in Kent, the former RAF Ash
 Ventnor, the former RAF Ventnor

European central air traffic control
On Thursday 9 June 1960, Britain, France, Belgium, Italy, Luxembourg, West Germany and Holland decided to coordinate air traffic control as jet aircraft were much quicker, to prevent collisions.

On Friday 20 December 1968, an agreement was signed to build Europe's first international control centre at Maastricht, to open in 1972, called the Maastricht Automatic Data Processing system or MADAP, which is now called the Maastricht Upper Area Control Centre; for the site, Plessey would built two computers, the controllers' consoles and a radar distribution unit. In 1981, the first computer data link between LATCC at West Drayton and Eurocontrol was established, followed by Brest Airport and Reims in 1986 and Paris in 1987; advanced boundary information (ABI) began in late 1990.

Eurocontrol, established on 1 March 1964, had been initially set up for eventually becoming a Europe-wide full air traffic control system, but individual countries could not together form agreements for this to fully happen; this meant that by the late 1980s Eurocontrol oversaw only flights above 25,000 feet over the Netherlands, Belgium and part of West Germany.

Much of European air traffic control is run on the CIMACT software package. The Single European Sky was created in the late 1990s, being official from 2001.

See also
 List of aviation, avionics, aerospace and aeronautical abbreviations
 Timeline of British military aviation

References

Air traffic control in the United Kingdom
Aviation history of the United Kingdom
History of air traffic control